Henry Sedley may refer to:
 Henry Sedley (actor)
 Henry Sedley (journalist)
 Sir Henry Sedley, 3rd Baronet, of the Sedley baronets